{{Infobox election
| election_name = 2014 United States Senate election in Georgia
| country = Georgia (U.S. state)
| type = presidential
| ongoing = no
| previous_election = 2008 United States Senate election in Georgia
| previous_year = 2008
| next_election = 2020–21 United States Senate election in Georgia
| next_year = 
| election_date = November 4, 2014
| image_size = 160x180px
| image1 = 
| nominee1 = David Perdue
| party1 = Republican Party (United States)
| popular_vote1 = 1,358,088
| percentage1 = 52.9%
| image2 = 
| nominee2 = Michelle Nunn
| party2 = Democratic Party (United States)
| popular_vote2 = 1,160,811
| percentage2 = 45.2%
| map_image = 2014 United States Senate election in Georgia results map by county.svg
| map_size = 240px
| map_caption = County resultsPerdue:     Nunn:     
| title = U.S. Senator
| before_election = Saxby Chambliss
| before_party = Republican Party (United States)
| after_election = David Perdue
| after_party = Republican Party (United States)
| turnout = 47.5% 
}}

The 2014 United States Senate election in Georgia' was held on November 4, 2014, to elect a member of the United States Senate to represent the State of Georgia, concurrently with the election of the Governor of Georgia, as well as elections to the United States Senate in other states, to the United States House of Representatives, and to various other state and local offices.

Incumbent Republican senator Saxby Chambliss announced on January 25, 2013, that he would not run for re-election, making it an open-seat race. After a close and contentious primary campaign, businessman David Perdue and U.S. Representative Jack Kingston advanced to a runoff for the Republican nomination, which was narrowly won by Perdue. The Democratic primary was decisively won by Points of Light CEO Michelle Nunn, the daughter of former U.S. Senator Sam Nunn. Also running was Libertarian nominee Amanda Swafford, a former Flowery Branch City Councilwoman.

If no candidate had received a majority of the vote, a runoff would have been held between the top two finishers on January 6, 2015, after the 114th Congress would have been sworn in, but in the end, David Perdue defeated Michelle Nunn by a margin of 7.7%.

Perdue's victory was part of a series of Republican victories across the nation. Nunn failed to improve on Obama's losing percentages in the state from two years earlier and any changes in the state's demographics were not enough for Democrats to prevail. Nevertheless, Nunn took credit for making the party competitive in the otherwise inhospitable South: "We put Georgia in play. We have reminded people what a two-party system looks like." Nunn's efforts to appeal to white voters were largely unsuccessful, with her not achieving 25% of the white vote, with conventional wisdom at the time stating that a Democrat needed 30% of the white vote to win.

 Republican primary 
In the early stages of the Republican primary campaign, the field was deemed a "clown car" by The Hill due to the prominence of far-right candidates within it. Prominent Tea Party supporter and U.S. Representative Paul Broun was the early frontrunner for the Republican nomination, with Public Policy Polling showing him with a double-digit lead over his fellow candidates. During September 2013 several prominent Republicans considered buying ads against Broun's campaign, as he was seen as unelectable due to his far-right policy positions, which included support for Young Earth creationism and the contention that medical schools taught "lies from the pits of hell." The primary was held on May 20, 2014. No candidate won more than 50% of the vote, so a runoff was held between the top two candidates, businessman David Perdue and U.S. Representative Jack Kingston. The 30.6 percent won by Perdue is the lowest ever for a first-place finisher in a Georgia U.S. Senate primary by either party in state history.

 Candidates 
 Paul Broun, U.S. Representative and candidate in 1996
 Art Gardner, patent attorney
 Phil Gingrey, U.S. Representative
 Derrick E. Grayson, conservative political activist
 Karen Handel, former secretary of state of Georgia, former Susan G. Komen executive and candidate for Governor in 2010
 Jack Kingston, U.S. Representative
 David Perdue, Georgia Ports Authority board member, former CEO of Dollar General and Reebok and cousin of former governor Sonny Perdue

 Withdrew 
 Eugene Yu, businessman, president of the Federation of Korean Associations and former deputy sheriff of Richmond County (ran for GA-12) Declined 
 Casey Cagle, Lieutenant Governor of Georgia
 Herman Cain, former CEO of the National Restaurant Association, former chairman of the Federal Reserve Bank of Kansas City and candidate for President in 2012
 Saxby Chambliss, incumbent U.S. Senator
 Doug Collins, U.S. Representative
 Erick Erickson, blogger, radio host and former member of the Macon City Council
 Newt Gingrich, former Speaker of the House of Representatives and candidate for President in 2012
 Tom Graves, U.S. Representative
 Brian Kemp, Secretary of State of Georgia
 Ed Lindsey, Majority Whip of the Georgia House of Representatives (ran for GA-11) Kelly Loeffler, co-owner of the Women's National Basketball Association team Atlanta Dream
 Barry Loudermilk, state senator (ran for GA-11) Sam Olens, Attorney General of Georgia
 Sonny Perdue, former governor of Georgia
 Tom Price, U.S. Representative
 David Ralston, Speaker of the Georgia House of Representatives
 Austin Scott, U.S. Representative
 Eric Tanenblatt, chief of staff to former governor Sonny Perdue
 Ross Tolleson, state senator
 Allen West, former U.S. Representative from FL-22
 Lynn Westmoreland, U.S. Representative
 Rob Woodall, U.S. Representative

 Endorsements 

 Polling 

 ^ Internal poll for Karen Handel campaign
 * Internal poll for Jack Kingston campaign

 Results 

 Runoff 
The runoff was held on July 22, 2014, which Perdue won with 50.9% of the vote. Kingston was perceived as the more conservative candidate in the race, but Perdue defeated him, largely due to strong support from business-friendly voters residing in the Atlanta suburbs. The runoff was noted for the large amount of advertisements run by both campaigns that focused around comparing their opponent to a baby.

 Endorsements 

 Polling 

 ^ Internal poll for David Perdue's campaign
 * Internal poll for Jack Kingston's campaign

 Results 

 Democratic primary 
 Campaign 
With Democratic Congressman John Barrow passing on the race, Michelle Nunn, a businesswoman and the daughter of former U.S. Senator Sam Nunn, consulted with the Democratic Senatorial Campaign Committee, as well as with Democratic Georgian political figures such as Shirley Franklin, Roy Barnes and Andrew Young about possibly running, Though she was little known to voters, Democrats embraced the hope that Nunn, with her executive experience as well as family name, could make their party once again competitive in-state.

On July 22, 2013, Nunn declared herself a candidate for U.S. Senate. She said: "Our opportunity is to define ourselves. I'm going to talk a lot about the deficit. Neither side of the equation is really tackling that. I think people are really tired of the mudslinging and the silliness of this." If elected, Nunn would have become the 29th Georgian elected to the U.S. Senate or U.S. House with a family member who previously served in Congress, and the first since her father (who is the grandnephew of Carl Vinson).

She raised $1.7 million in campaign funds during the third quarter of 2013, more than twice that of any Republican running. She followed that with a $1.6 million fourth quarter and a $2.4 million first quarter of 2014, again the most of anyone in the race.

On May 20, 2014, Nunn won the Democratic primary for the Senate seat with 75 percent of the vote, having skipped many of the debates and public forums where three other little-known candidates appeared.

 Candidates 
 Steen Miles, former state senator, candidate for Lieutenant Governor in 2006 and candidate for DeKalb County CEO in 2000 and 2008
 Michelle Nunn, CEO of Points of Light and daughter of former U.S. Senator Sam Nunn
 Branko Radulovacki, physician
 Todd Robinson, Reserve Officers' Training Corps instructor and former U.S. Army Ranger

 Withdrew 
 Gerald Beckum, Mayor of Oglethorpe (ran for Secretary of State) Declined 
 Stacey Abrams, Minority Leader of the Georgia House of Representatives
 David I. Adelman, United States Ambassador to Singapore and former state senator
 Peter Aman, former COO of Atlanta
 Thurbert Baker, former Attorney General of Georgia and candidate for Governor in 2010
 Roy Barnes, former governor
 John Barrow, U.S. Representative from 12th Georgia District
 Sanford Bishop, U.S. Representative
 Jason Carter, state senator and grandson of former president and former governor Jimmy Carter (ran for governor) Max Cleland, former U.S. Senator
 Cathy Cox, president of Young Harris College, former secretary of state of Georgia and candidate for Governor in 2006
 Shirley Franklin, former mayor of Atlanta
 Scott Holcomb, state representative (endorsed Nunn) Vernon Jones, former DeKalb County CEO and candidate for the U.S. Senate in 2008
 Jim Marshall, former U.S. Representative
 Keith Mason, chief of staff to former governor Zell Miller
 Stephen Oppenheimer, businessman, Task Force Coordinator for Clean Cities Atlanta and nominee for District 3 of the Georgia Public Service Commission in 2012
 DuBose Porter, former state representative and candidate for governor in 2010
 Doug Stoner, former state senator
 Mark Taylor, former lieutenant governor of Georgia and nominee for Governor in 2006
 Steve Thompson, state senator
 Michael Thurmond, interim Superintendent of the DeKalb County School District, former Georgia Labor Commissioner and nominee for the U.S. Senate in 2010
 Kasim Reed, Mayor of Atlanta

 Endorsements 

 Polling 

 Results 

 Libertarian primary 
 Candidates 
 Declared 
 Amanda Swafford, former Flowery Branch City Councilwoman

 General election 
 Campaign 
Following the conclusion of the two primaries, the race was set up as being between two self-described political "outsiders" with well-known-in-state political family names, each seeking to reach moderate and independent voters.

In July 2014, National Review, a conservative media outlet, reported on a leaked Nunn campaign memo from December 2013 which made frank recommendations on strategy for Nunn's path to victory in Georgia. The leaked memo said that likely attack lines against Nunn would include that she was a "lightweight", "too liberal", and "not a 'real' Georgian". The memo said that Nunn should feature images of her and her family in rural settings in order to connect with rural voters, and suggested that Nunn focus on African American clergy to raise enthusiasm for her candidacy among African American voters and that Nunn focus her efforts on Jews and Asians to raise money.

First Lady Michelle Obama campaigned on behalf of Nunn, as part of an effort to increase African-American voter turnout in midterm elections.

Nunn's stump speech emphasized an appeal to bipartisanship. She received support and donations from former Republican senators Richard Lugar and John Warner, both of whom were close to her father, and support from former Georgia Senator and Governor Zell Miller, a Democrat who had endorsed Republicans over the previous decade. Nunn's campaign commercials used photographs of herself and President George H. W. Bush, who founded Points of Light, together in campaign commercials and she mentioned him often on the campaign trail. However, in June 2014, Bush sent out a fundraising letter that, while not mentioning her by name, called on Republican donors to support the Republican nominee, and in September 2014, Bush endorsed Perdue. In October 2014, Bush emphatically objected to Nunn continuing to use a photograph of him in her campaign, saying that such actions were disrespectful. Points of Light chair Neil Bush neither endorsed nor opposed her candidacy, but did label as "shameful" an advertisement approved by Perdue that used a past episode to say that Points of Light "gave money to organizations linked to terrorists."

As the campaign moved on, Nunn made her father a focal point, staging joint appearances with him at military bases and saying that she would emulate his bipartisan approach to legislating. She has also said that she would seek a seat on the Senate Armed Services Committee that he once chaired.

Perdue stated that he entered politics out of concern for the rising national debt. He supported repeal and replacement of the Affordable Care Act. He also supported a constitutional balanced budget amendment and comprehensive tax reform. In addition, he pledged to limit himself to two terms in the Senate, if elected.

Perdue[he] represent[s] and touted his business experience, and particularly his experience at Dollar General, saying, "We added about 2,200 stores, created almost 20,000 jobs and doubled the value of that company in a very short period of time. Not because of me, but because we listened to our customers and employees." He received the endorsement of the National Federation of Independent Business. But he was hurt during the campaign by revelations that he had in the past been an enthusiastic supporter of outsourcing. Nunn targeted past pre-political statements of Perdue where he had said he was "proud of" his outsourcing efforts, and for the job losses that followed the final closure of Pillowtex.

 Policy positions 
Perdue supported repeal and replacement of the Affordable Care Act. He supported a constitutional balanced budget amendment and comprehensive tax reform. He pledged to limit himself to two terms in the Senate, if elected.

Nunn supported abortion rights. Nunn believed that members of Congress should be forced to pass a budget each year, or forfeit their pay. Nunn supported expanding federally mandated background checks to include all local sales to prevent the possibility that mentally ill persons would be able to buy a firearm. Nunn said that going forward, some aspects of the Affordable Care Act should be fixed rather than the whole law being eliminated. She criticized Georgia's refusal to accept Medicaid expansion under the act. Following the start-up problems with the associated HealthCare.gov website, Nunn broke with the Obama administration and said that the individual mandate portion of the law should be delayed.
Nunn supported the 2013 Senate immigration plan that would have allowed illegal immigrants to stay in the United States while waiting for American citizenship.
Nunn favored construction of the Keystone XL Pipeline. She opposed the Obama administration's proposed cuts to defense spending.
On the topic of same-sex marriage, Nunn said she personally favored it, but that the decision should be made on a state-by-state basis.

 Debates 
Perdue and Nunn held debates on August 21, October 7, October 26, and November 2.

 Complete video of debate, August 21, 2014
 Complete video of debate , October 7, 2014
 Complete video of debate, October 26, 2014
 Complete video of debate, November 2, 2014

 Fundraising 
David Perdue has funded more than $1.9 million of his campaign personally; the second-largest total of any Senate candidate. A total of $23,355,844 was raised by the candidates for this race, of which a total of $22,917,058 was spent by the campaigns.

 Spending 
This Senate race, as many others across the United States, was heavily influenced by outside PACs and organizations who supported various candidates. The U.S. Chamber of Commerce alone was expected to spend almost $50 million on elections in 2014. More than $4.6 million had been spent on advertising in the race by outside groups by May 2014.

 Predictions 

 Polling 

With Broun

With Chambliss

With Gingrey

With Grayson

With Handel

With Kingston

With Price

With Yu

 Results 

 See also 
 2014 United States Senate elections
 2014 United States House of Representatives elections in Georgia
 2014 Georgia gubernatorial election
 2014 United States elections

Notes

 References 

 External links 
 U.S. Senate elections in Georgia, 2014 at Ballotpedia
 
 Campaign contributions at OpenSecrets.org
Official campaign websites (Archived)
 David Perdue for U.S. Senate Republican primary Michelle Nunn for U.S. Senate Democratic primary''

2014
Georgia
2014 Georgia (U.S. state) elections